Sree Rama temple, Ramapuram is a Hindu temple situated at Ramapuram, between Malappuram and Perinthalmanna in Kerala state, India. The temple is dedicated to Lord Rama, the 7th avatar of Lord Vishnu. There are shrines for Ganapathi, Sastha and Hanuman too in this temple.

See also
 Temples of Kerala

References

Hindu temples in Malappuram district
Rama temples